Plectroscapus bimaculatus is a species of beetle in the family Cerambycidae, and the only species in the genus Plectroscapus. It was described by Gahan in 1890.

References

Stenobiini
Beetles described in 1890